For the purposes of calculating sales, a single is currently defined by the Official Charts Company (OCC) as either a 'single bundle' having no more than four tracks and not lasting longer than 25 minutes or one digital audio track not longer than 15 minutes with a minimum sale price of 40 pence. The rules have changed many times as technology has developed, the most notable being the inclusion of digital downloads in 2004 and streaming in 2014.

The best-selling single in the UK is "Something About the Way You Look Tonight"/"Candle in the Wind 1997", a double A-side released by Elton John following the death of Diana, Princess of Wales. Since September 1997, the single has sold over 5.4 million copies in the UK.

Sales of singles have been monitored and charted in the UK since 1952, when Percy Dickins of New Musical Express (NME) telephoned around 20 record stores and aggregated their best-selling singles into a hit parade. Dickins published this Top 12 chart in NME on 14 November 1952.

The highest-selling single by a solo female artist is "Believe" by Cher – released in October 1998, it has sold over 1.8 million copies in the UK.

The best-selling single not to top the UK Singles Chart is "Moves Like Jagger" by Maroon 5 and Christina Aguilera, which spent seven weeks at number two in 2011 and has sold 1,536,041 copies. It replaced "Last Christmas" by Wham! on 1 January 2021 when this reached number one, 36 years after its release in December 1984. When streaming is taken into account, both are beaten by "All of Me" by John Legend, which has over 2.1 million combined sales.

The highest-selling single (paid-for purchases) in the 21st century is "Happy" by Pharrell Williams, which has sold 1.93 million; it overtook "Anything Is Possible" / "Evergreen" by Will Young in 2015.

The most streamed song is "Shape of You" by Ed Sheeran with over 200 million streams (2 million equivalent sales) from 2017. Twenty other songs have been streamed over 100 million times, including two more by Ed Sheeran.

Best-selling singles based on paid-for purchases
Until June 2014, only a paid download or a purchase of a physical single counted as a sale. Based on this definition, these are the 50 best-selling singles in the UK. Sales positions are current .

Best-selling songs based on combined sales
From 2014 streaming has counted towards sales (sometimes called "combined sales" or "chart sales") at the rate of 100 streams equal to one download or physical purchase, although the singles chart no longer uses this ratio. In September 2017, the OCC changed their definition of a 'million seller' to include streaming. These are the 50 biggest selling songs based on combined physical, download and streaming sales, as at September 2017.

See also
 List of million-selling singles in the United Kingdom
 List of most downloaded songs in the United Kingdom
 List of most streamed songs in the United Kingdom
 List of Platinum singles in the United Kingdom awarded before 2000
 List of Platinum singles in the United Kingdom awarded since 2000

Notes

References

External links
Official UK Singles Top 100 at the Official Charts Company

British music industry